El Hadj Wade, also known as El Hadji Babacar Wade or Babacar Wade, is a Senegalese windsurfer. He competed in the Windglider event at the 1984 Summer Olympics.

References

External links
 
 

Year of birth missing (living people)
Living people
Senegalese windsurfers
Senegalese male sailors (sport)
Olympic sailors of Senegal
Sailors at the 1984 Summer Olympics – Windglider
Place of birth missing (living people)